"Let Me Down Easy" is a song by Australian indie pop band Sheppard. It was included on their debut extended play Sheppard in 2012 and their debut album Bombs Away in 2014. The song was not released as a single in Australia, but used to promote the extended play, which went on to achieve double platinum accreditation. The song received APRA and ARIA award nominations. "Let Me Down Easy" was released as an international single in January 2015.

Promotion
The song received a lot of radio airplay. It also featured on The Today Show, Ten Late News, Nine's Mornings and Packed to the Rafters.

Music
"Let Me Down Easy" is set in the key of A major.

Videos
Three videos were released to promote "Let Me Down Easy"

Acoustic version:
An acoustic version was released on Steve Madden's YouTube account on 28 September 2012.

Australian version:
The Australian version was released on their YouTube account on 1 May 2013.
It was filmed using a hand-held camera and has the band singing the song in a car yard.

International version:
The International version was released on Vevo 23 February 2015.
It was directed by Matt Stawski and has the band singing outside a window as a young lady throws clothes out at them.

Track listing
Digital download
"Let Me Down Easy "  (album version)  – 3:47
"Let Me Down Easy "  (radio version)  – 3:32

Reviews
ESBM of Eat Sleep Breathe Music in a review of "Let Me Down Easy" said; "This Brisbane Australia’s sibling 6-piece act will instantly charm your ears with their feel, good, finger snapping, toe tapping that is reminiscent of lovable 50’s pop." Marcus Floyd of Renowned for Sound, in a review of Bombs Away, said; "the hook has a beautiful harmonious arrangement and the instrumentation is so simple that it makes the track all the more welcoming."

Awards

APRA Awards
The APRA Awards are presented annually from 1982 by the Australasian Performing Right Association (APRA).

|-
|rowspan="2"| 2014 || rowspan="2"| "Let Me Down Easy" (Jay Bovino, Amy Sheppard, George Sheppard) – Sheppard || Most Played Australian Work|| 
|-
| Pop Work of the Year||

ARIA Awards

The ARIA Music Awards are presented annually from 1987 by the Australian Recording Industry Association (ARIA).

|-
| 2013 || "Let Me Down Easy" || Best Independent Release || 
|-

Charts

Release history

References

2015 singles
2012 songs
Sheppard (band) songs
Decca Records singles